Elections were held in the Australian state of Queensland between 28 April 1888 and 26 May 1888 to elect the members of the state's Legislative Assembly.

Key dates
Due to problems of distance and communications, it was not possible to hold the elections on a single day.

See also
 Members of the Queensland Legislative Assembly, 1888–1893

References

Elections in Queensland
1888 elections in Australia
1880s in Queensland
April 1888 events
May 1888 events